Spartocerini is a tribe of leaf-footed bugs in the family Coreidae. There are about 6 genera and at least 60 described species in Spartocerini.

Genera
 Euagona Dallas, 1852
 Eubule Stål, 1867
 Menenotus Laporte, 1832
 Molchina Amyot and Serville, 1843
 Sephina Amyot & Serville, 1843
 Spartocera Laporte, 1832

References

 Packauskas, Richard (2010). "Catalog of the Coreidae, or Leaf-Footed Bugs, of the New World". Fort Hays Studies, Fourth Series, no. 5, 270.
 Thomas J. Henry, Richard C. Froeschner. (1988). Catalog of the Heteroptera, True Bugs of Canada and the Continental United States. Brill Academic Publishers.

Further reading

 Arnett, Ross H. (2000). American Insects: A Handbook of the Insects of America North of Mexico. CRC Press.

 
Coreinae
Hemiptera tribes